Eu4ya is an Italian Eurodance band from Milan.

History
The band recorded old songs as dance versions. They covered hits such as "Disco Blu", "Disco Rouge", "Anti-Funk", "Let's Go Dancing", "Everybody Jump", "Blue Monday", "Sarà perchè ti amo" and "Na Na Hey Hey Kiss Him Goodbye". The band played mostly live in Canada. In 2007, they released the song "Tanti Auguri" as Eu4ya meets Elissa on the sampler Italo Boot Mix 2007. Eu4ya performed the live version of "Tanti Auguri" with Raffaella Carra and Elissa. Frontwoman Barbara Tausia is the wife of French footballer Nicolas Anelka.

Discography
Singles
 2003: "Sarà perchè ti amo" (Do it Yourself)
 2004: "Na Na Hey Hey Kiss Him Goodbye" (Do it Yourself)
 2006: "Tanti Auguri" (as Eu4ya meets Elissa) (Tunnel Records)

External links
 Profile by Discogs

Italian Eurodance groups
Italian electronic music groups
Italian dance music groups
Musical groups established in 2003
Musical groups from Milan